The cubic ton is a measure of volume. It is considered obsolete in the United Kingdom and is now used primarily in the United States.

Definitions
A mass-derived unit of volume is defined by reference to the density of some material.  One common such material is water, used in multiple units.  For the cubic ton, the situation is more complex—there are different cubic tons for different materials.

The 1964 Reader's Digest Great Encyclopaedic Dictionary gave the following ton-derived volumes:

 Timber,  
 Stone, 
 Salt, 
 Lime, 
 Coke, 
 Wheat, 

The nearest thing to a standard cubic ton seems to be the "timber" cubic ton which is used by freight transport operators in the US.

Conversions
Converting cubic tons (i.e., volumes) to measures of weight presents difficulties because organic materials such as timber vary in density.

Approximate volume conversions, based on a timber cubic ton of 40 cubic feet:
 1  ton (40 cubic feet) = 1.133 cubic metres
 1 cubic metre = 0.883 cubic tons (35.32 cubic feet)

See also

 Board foot
 Cord
 Hoppus
 Gross tonnage 
 Net tonnage
 List of unusual units of measurement
 Stere
 Tun (unit)
 Units of measurement

References

Units of volume